Hwawon Park is a park located in Daegu Dalseong-gun, South Korea. It opened on 10 March 1981 and is mainly used by children.

References

Parks in Daegu
Dalseong County